The Moosup Valley State Park Trail is a rail trail located on the railbed of a former New York, New Haven and Hartford Railroad line in the New England towns of Plainfield and Sterling in Windham County, Connecticut. The line ran from 1898 until 1968. The rail line was abandoned in the late 1960s, and was designated by the state as a multi-use trail in 1987. The trail is owned and operated by the Connecticut Department of Energy and Environmental Protection.

The Moosup Valley Trail, together with the Quinebaug River Trail and the Air Line Trail, is "a critical link" in the Hartford to Providence section of the planned East Coast Greenway.

Crossings

References

External links
Moosup Valley State Park Trail Connecticut Department of Energy and Environmental Protection
Moosup Valley State Park Trail Map Connecticut Department of Energy and Environmental Protection
Plainfield: Moosup Valley State Park Trail Connecticut Department of Transportation
Sterling: Moosup Valley State Park Trail Connecticut Department of Transportation

 
 

Rail trails in Connecticut
State parks of Connecticut
East Coast Greenway
Plainfield, Connecticut
Protected areas of Windham County, Connecticut
Parks in Windham County, Connecticut
Sterling, Connecticut
Protected areas established in 1987
1987 establishments in Connecticut